Beth Shalom Rodfe Zedek is a Reform synagogue in Chester, Connecticut.   The congregation is noted for the architecture of  its "spectacular" building.

History

Congregation Rodfe Zedek was founded in Moodus, Connecticut in 1905. The fledgling congregation purchased and worshipped in a small, eighteenth-century house before building its first, modest synagogue in 1915.

Congregation Beth Shalom was founded in the 1930s.  Calling itself the Jewish Community Center of Middlesex County, it  worshipped at first in the home of chicken farmer and founder Isadore Romanof, then in a room in the Deep River Public Library in Deep River, Connecticut.  In 1942 the congregation purchased a former church building for use as a synagogue.

The two congregations merged in the 1990s and in 1998 began plans to build a new synagogue.

Building

The congregation's building was designed by a congregation  member, the noted artist  Sol LeWitt in close collaboration with architect Stephen Lloyd.   LeWitt  conceived the "airy" synagogue building, with its shallow dome supported by "exuberant  wooden roof beams" an homage to the Wooden synagogues of eastern Europe. The spacious foyer is designed to be used as an art gallery, and has hosted exhibits by contemporary artists including Jane Logemann.

External links
http://www.cbsrz.org/

References

Buildings and structures in Middlesex County, Connecticut
Chester, Connecticut
Reform synagogues in Connecticut
Synagogues completed in 1998
1998 establishments in Connecticut